The Emperor's Games is the third and last book in a historical fiction trilogy about the 1st-century Roman Empire. Set primarily in Rome and Lower Germany circa AD 81-83, it follows the adventures of a pair of Roman brothers – one free-born and one slave-born – as they serve in the Roman legions.

Plot summary
Correus Appius Julianus is the slave born son of retired Roman general Flavius Appius Julianus who is currently posted as a senior centurion to the Roman naval base of Misenum in modern-day Naples near Pompeii. The novel opens with Correus frustrated at serving in a peacetime establishment and requesting transfer to a more active post. After overseeing the new emperor Titus's games, including a naval fight, Correus' wish is granted as he is sent off to destroy some pirates while his young wife Ygerna has to remain behind to give birth to her baby. She also has to try to assert her authority as a stepmother over Correus' five-year-old son, which provokes a family war with Correus' half-sister Julia, who has raised the boy for the past five years.

Upon returning from his successful mission to destroy the pirates, Correus is caught up in the new emperor Domitian's determination to win a triumph at the expense of Correus' old adversaries on the German border. This is complicated by Correus' own off-again, on-again friendship with the German chief and his half-brother Flavius' romance with the widow of that same former chieftain. There is also a complicated subplot involving a truly nasty Senator who is attempting to orchestrate a plot to depose the emperor – a plot that the Julianus family ends up being intimately involved in through the actions of their brother-in-law Paulinus. The fast-paced conclusion ends with the defeat of the Germans, and the transfer of Correus to a new post in the Roman province of Dacia.

Analysis
The novels are marked by their author's obvious love of the topic and the clearly intensive research she did to write them – the depictions of 1st-century Roman life have the ring of authenticity. The trilogy is also remarkable in that both sides are portrayed sympathetically, though the Romans – Correus in particular – are clearly the heroes of the story. However, there is enough ambiguity on both sides that the reader can't help being drawn into the lives of the characters.

Trivia
The Centurions trilogy was written by Amanda Cockrell writing under the pseudonym Damion Hunter. The other two books in the series are the eponymous The Centurions which begin the tale of the two brothers and their extended family and Barbarian Princess. It is unknown why the series never continued past the third book as it was clearly intended to be a much lengthier tale, though the most probable reasons are a lack of consumer interest or a change of direction from either the publisher or the author.

The Centurions Trilogy
1984 American novels
Novels set in ancient Rome
Novels set in the 1st century
Historical novels
Ballantine Books books